{{safesubst:#invoke:RfD|||month = March
|day = 10
|year = 2023
|time = 23:11
|timestamp = 20230310231111

|content=
REDIRECT Syngman Rhee

}}